Vasilovo (Wäsil) is a rural locality (a village) in Kalmiyabashevsky Selsoviet, Kaltasinsky District, Bashkortostan, Russia. The population was 273 as of 2010. There are 4 streets.

Geography 
Vasilovo is located 28 km southeast of Kaltasy (the district's administrative centre) by road. Babayevo is the nearest rural locality.

References 

Rural localities in Kaltasinsky District